Esports Heaven is an esports news and community website, formed from the merging of Cadred.org and tek-9.org in 2013. Cadred was a coverage site for competitive video gaming, or esports, owned by Heaven Media Group, a United Kingdom based marketing agency, which focuses on tech, esports, and gaming clientele.

Cadred
 
Cadred was active from 9 July 2006 to 25 November 2013. Cadred was based around a community which grew with an old Finnish esports team, Insignia Cadre. In July 2007 it was decided that the team would continue to operate at the InsigniaCadre.org domain, while the coverage and community site would continue at Cadred.org. On 23 June 2008 it was announced that the Cadred brand had been sold to Heaven Media Group, in a deal apparently worth over £150,000.

Site functions
Cadred covers three major esports games - Counter-Strike: Source, Counter Strike 1.6 and Call of Duty 4.

Partnerships
Cadred has partnered with a number of the biggest names in esports, ranging from News Corporation's Championship Gaming Series to "LAN party" events around Europe.

References

External links 
 Former Cadred website
 Heaven Media website
 Heaven History

Esports websites